Aquisalibacillus  is a moderately halophilic, rod-shaped and non-motile genus of bacteria from the family of Bacillaceae with one known species (Aquisalibacillus elongatus).

References

Bacillaceae
Bacteria genera
Monotypic bacteria genera